Langmuir-Blodgett may refer to:
Langmuir–Blodgett film
Langmuir–Blodgett trough
Irving Langmuir and Katharine Burr Blodgett